The 1977 Wyler's Classic, also known as the Atlanta Women's Tennis Classic, was a women's singles tennis tournament played on indoor carpet courts at the Alexander Memorial Coliseum in Atlanta, Georgia in the United States. The event was part of the AA category of the 1977 Colgate Series. It was the second edition of the tournament and was held from October 3 through October 9, 1977. First-seeded Chris Evert won the singles title, her second at the event after 1975, and earned $14,000 first-prize money.

Finals

Singles
 Chris Evert defeated  Dianne Fromholtz 6–3, 6–2
 It was Evert's 10th singles title of the year and the 77th of her career.

Doubles
 Martina Navratilova /  Betty Stöve defeated  Brigitte Cuypers /  Marise Kruger 6–4, 6–2

Prize money

Notes

References

Wyler's Classic
Wyler's Classic
Wyler's Classic
Wyler's Classic